Sir Thomas Reynell, 6th Baronet  (1777–1848) was a 19th century British Army officer. He was Colonel in Chief of the 71st Highlanders from 1841 to 1848.

As a "career soldier", Reynell devoted his entire career to the army, serving from the age of 16. He saw action in several battles and wars, including Battle of Cape Town, the Peninsular Wars in Portugal, and Siege of Bhurtpore in India.

Life
Reynell was descended from the Reynell baronets of Laleham on the River Thames. The Reynell family had been settled in Devon for centuries and were mainly associated with East Ogwell, although the first two Baronets also had strong links with Ireland.

He was born in eastern Canada on April 9, 1777, the son of Lt Thomas Reynell (1746-1777), an officer on active duty with the 62nd Regiment of Foot, and Anne Carty of Kinsale. The elder Reynell was involved with the Canadian Campaign under command of Lt-Col John Anstruther. He died from a gunshot wound in the head at the Battle of Freeman's Farm near Saratoga on 19 September 1777, a few months after the younger Reynell's birth. Anne Carty, young Thomas, and his siblings were then taken as a prisoner of war along with various captured troops. The Continental Congress of November 1778 authorised their release, but this did not occur until May 1779 by which time Reynell was two years old.

Over ten years later, a more mature Reynell decided on a military career and joined the newly created 38th Regiment of Foot as an Ensign in 1793 shortly after his 16th birthday. This being at the start of the French Revolutionary Wars it may have also been inspired by patriotism . It is not clear if he served in Ireland, but he sailed to the West Indies and was present at the capture of Martinique in March 1794. He was at the capture of St Lucia in May 1796 and the capture of Trinidad in 1797.

Prior to 1805, he transferred to the 71st Highlanders and was raised to the rank of Brevet Colonel. He went to the Cape of Good Hope (against the Dutch) in August 1805 and was part of the Battle of Cape Town in January 1806 in which both his old and new regiments fought. His placement on lighter but very well-paid duties from 1806 to 1808 may indicate an injury. During this period he was Deputy Quartermaster General for India.

He returned to active duties with the 71st Highlanders in June 1808 joining them in Portugal for the Peninsular War. He fought at the Battle of Roliça in "Ferguson's Brigade" fighting the French under Delaborde on 17 August. Four days later he was in the Battle of Vimeiro. On 16 January 1809, he fought with them at the Battle of Corunna his most substantial battle to date.

The regiment returned to England for several months before being sent to fight in the disastrous Walcheren Campaign under Baron Francis de Rottenburg. They returned to England in the spring of 1810.

In September 1810 they returned to the Peninsular War. After some months of skirmishes they fought in the major Battle of Fuentes de Oñoro (3 to 5 May 1811). Another major conflict occurred on 28 October 1811 when he fought at the Battle of Arroyo dos Molinos in Howard's (1st) Brigade. In May 1812 he fought in the Battle of Almaraz. A year later in June 1813, he was in the Battle of Vitoria - a major bloodbath in which Wellington was victorious. The army pushed the defeated French back into France, involving further conflict: the Battle of the Pyrenees (25 July 1813).

Pursuing the Napoleonic Army, they fought the Battle of Nivelle in November, Battle of the Nive in December, and the Battle of Orthez in February 1814. In April, they fought what they thought was the final victory over Napoleon at the Battle of Toulouse. This final battle was four days after Napoleon's surrender and served to quell the still militant French forces.

In July 1814, the war-weary regiment was shipped back to England in what they must have thought was the end of this long war. However, following Napoleon's escape and return to power they had to ship to Ostend in April 1815. After searching for the French army south of Brussels the two huge forces met in the farm fields south of the tiny village of Waterloo. The subsequent battle resulted in the true final defeat of Napoleon. Unfortunately, Reynell, now a Lt Colonel, was one of the thousands of men who were wounded in this battle.

Again placed on lighter duties, he did not go with his regiment to Canada but instead in 1825 returned to India in command of the 1st Infantry Division. Unfortunately, this choice placed him at the Siege of Bhurtpore in December 1825/January 1826.

In 1829 Thomas became Baronet of Laleham in Surrey following the death of his older brother Richard Littleton Reynell (b.1772), 5th baronet, who had obtained the baronetcy through an uncle in 1798. Richard appears to have been a baronet in name only and lived the entire duration of his baronetcy in America, rather than the family seat of Laleham.

In 1841 he succeeded Lt Gen Samuel Ford Whittingham as Colonel in Chief following Whittingham's death.

He died on 10 February 1848 at Arundel in Sussex and is buried under a granite monument in the churchyard of St Mary's in Walberton. His will is held in the National Archive at Kew.

Family

In 1831 (aged 54) he married Lady Elizabeth Louisa Pack (1783-1856), widow of Sir Denis Pack, with whom he had served in the Peninsular War. He had written to Pack from 1810 to 1823.

Both were too old to have children. Reynell died childless and the baronetcy died with him.

Artistic recognition

His portrait by William Salter (of around 1830) shows a very weary soldier. It is held by the National Portrait Gallery, London but is rarely displayed.

References
 

1777 births
1848 deaths
Baronets in the Baronetage of Ireland
British Army generals